The New Zealand Urban Design Protocol was published in March 2005 by the Ministry for the Environment to recognise the importance of urban design to the development of successful towns and cities. The protocol is a voluntary commitment by central and local government, property developers and investors, design professionals, educational institutes and other groups to undertake specific urban design initiatives.

Six Essential Attributes
The protocol identifies six essential attributes that successful towns and cities share;
 Competitive places that thrive economically and facilitate creativity and innovation
 Liveable places that provide a choice of housing, work and lifestyle options
 Environmentally responsible places that manage all aspects of the environment sustainably
 Inclusive places that offer opportunities for all citizens
 Distinctive places that have a strong identity and sense of place
 Well-governed places that have a shared vision and sense of direction.

The Seven Cs
The protocol is centred on “The Seven Cs”, which are considered the essential design qualities that create urban design;
 Context
 Character
 Choice
 Connections
 Creativity
 Custodianship
 Collaboration

Authorship
The New Zealand Urban Design Protocol was prepared with input from the following professionals;

Urban Design Advisory Group
 Penny Pirrit, Manager Environmental Planning, Auckland City Council
 Robert Tongue, City Architect, Dunedin City Council
 Patrick Fontein, Principal, Kensington Properties; President, Auckland Branch of the Property Council of New Zealand
 John Sinclair, Consultant, Architectus
 Chris McDonald, Senior Lecturer, Victoria University School of Architecture
 Ernst Zollner, Lecturer, University of Auckland Department of Planning; Chief Advisor, Strategic and Economic Development, Wellington City Council
 Doug Leighton, Principal, Boffa Miskell
 Karen Goodall, Executive Director, City for Auckland
 David Fox, Managing Director, Fox and Associates
 Simon Whiteley, Policy and Strategy Manager, Land Transport New Zealand
 John Tocker, Principal, David Jerram Architects
 Alison Dalziel, Advisor, Department of Prime Minister and Cabinet; Chair of the Sustainable Cities Senior Officials Group

Ministry for the Environment
 Lindsay Gow, Deputy Chief Executive and Chair of the Urban Design Advisory Group
 Luke Troy, Senior Advisor
 Yvonne Weeber, Senior Advisor
 Frances Lane Brooker, Senior Advisor
 Erica Sefton, Senior Advisor

External links
 Ministry for the Environment: Urban Issues: The New Zealand Urban Design Protocol (summary)
 Ministry for the Environment: Publications: New Zealand Urban Design Protocol (document)

Urban planning in New Zealand
Urban design
Environment of New Zealand